The Charles E. Lutton Man of Music Award is one of the highest honors awarded to members of the Phi Mu Alpha Sinfonia fraternity for a lifelong achievement in uplifting the world through art and music. Its recipients include musical legends such as Aaron Copland, W. Francis McBeth, James Levine, Frederick Fennell, Maynard Ferguson, and Col. John R. Bourgeois, USMC (Ret.).

The name
The award is named for Charles E. Lutton, a member of Phi Mu Alpha Sinfonia.

History
The first award was given in 1952 in honor of Lutton.

References

American music awards
Phi Mu Alpha Sinfonia